Justice Kennedy refers to Anthony Kennedy, associate justice of the United States Supreme Court. Justice Kennedy may also refer to:

Hugh Kennedy, the first chief justice of Ireland
Mark Kennedy (Alabama judge), associate justice of the Alabama Supreme Court
Paul Kennedy (American judge), associate justice of the New Mexico Supreme Court
Paul J. Kennedy, associate justice of the New Mexico Supreme Court
Sharon L. Kennedy, associate justice of the Supreme Court of Ohio

See also
Lord Justice Kennedy (disambiguation)
Judge Kennedy (disambiguation)